SAR-Lupe is Germany's first reconnaissance satellite system and is used for military purposes. SAR is an abbreviation for synthetic-aperture radar, and "Lupe" is German for magnifying glass. The SAR-Lupe program consists of five identical (770 kg) satellites, developed by the German aeronautics company OHB-System, which are controlled by a ground station responsible for controlling the system and analysing the retrieved data. The total price of the satellites was over 250 million Euro.

Specifications 

SAR-Lupe's "high-resolution" images can be acquired day or night through all weather conditions. The satellites are able to provide up-to-date imagery from almost all regions of the world.

The first satellite was launched from Plesetsk in Russia on 19 December 2006, about a year after the intended launch date; four more satellites were launched at roughly six-month intervals, and the entire system achieved full operational readiness on 22 July 2008. The constellation is planned for 10 years of operational life.

The five satellites operate in three 500-kilometre orbits in planes roughly 60° apart. They use an X-band radar with a 3-metre dish, providing a resolution of about 50 centimetres over a frame size of 5.5 km on a side ("spotlight mode", in which the satellite rotates to keep the dish pointed at a single target) or about 1 metre over a frame size of 8 km × 60 km ("stripmap mode", in which the satellite maintains a fixed orientation over the Earth, and the radar image is formed simply by the satellite's motion along its orbit). Response time for imaging of a given area is 10 hours or less. Thales Alenia Space provided the core of the synthetic-aperture radar sensors.

History 

The SAR-Lupe satellites are the first German military satellites.

The testing of SAR-Lupe involved an inverse procedure, in which the satellite, mounted in a radome on Earth, was used to image the International Space Station, whose orbit is reasonably close to the one the satellite will eventually be in. One-metre resolution at the ISS was apparently achieved.

On 30 July 2002 a cooperation treaty between Germany and France was signed, under which the SAR-Lupe satellites and the French Helios optical reconnaissance satellite will operate jointly. Other EU countries have been invited to join as well, and Italy has shown considerable interest.

Radar component 

XSAR of SAR-Lupe is observing in X-band (center frequency of 9.65 GHz corresponding to a wavelength of 3.1 cm).

 Global observation coverage capability.
 Use of a parabolic SAR reflector antenna of 3.3 m × 2.7 m size. The choice of using a single-beam offset reflector antenna instead of an active beam-steering antenna represented a major cost saving in the development of the instrument. SAR-Lupe uses a single-beam offset reflector antenna and a travelling-wave tube (TWT) transmitter, illuminated by a feed horn on a deployable boom. The highly efficient TWT and a low-loss high-gain antenna are providing good power potential for radar with efficient DC power utilization.

Prior to an image acquisition, the satellite rolls in an appropriate position and stabilizes its attitude. Then, the SAR image is acquired. After that, the satellite rolls back into its standby attitude and continues to charge its batteries, preparing itself for the next SAR image acquisition.

 Number of scenes of area of interest: ≥ 30/day.
 System response time: < 36 hours.
 System availability: 95%.
 Automated monitoring and control of the constellation via a ground control station.
 Automated data reception and image processing.
 LEOP (launch and early orbit phase) support is provided by DLR/GSOC.
 The mean response time of the system is in the range of 10 hours. System availability is provided by the distribution of the satellites in their orbital planes.
 The modular interface design of the ground segment permits also future integration into an international reconnaissance network (mutual utilization of the system, etc.).
 SAR imaging modes provided: stripmap and spotlight. Stripmap imaging involves antenna pointing into a fixed direction (normally in cross-track). Internally, these modes are referred to as “Strip-SAR” and “Slip-SAR”. Strip-SAR observations are conducted in the nadir direction. In Slip-SAR mode, the entire spacecraft is rotated into the direction of the target to increase the integration time and therefore the in-track resolution.
 Spatial resolution of SAR data: 0.5 m in spotlight mode for a scene of about 5.5 km × 5.5 km in size; a stripmap scene has a size of 60 km × 8 km. It can provide NESZ (noise equivalent sigma naught) range up to −19.91 dB.
 Satellite operations permit “spotlight imaging” of a scene. This involves rotation of the entire spacecraft about a target area to increase the integration time of the scene (the SAR beacon is pointable). In SAR-Lupe terminology, spotlight imaging is referred to as “Slip-SAR”.
 An onboard image storage capability of 128 Gbit (EOL) is provided.
 The main image products are: 1) stripmap scenes of size 60 km × 8 km, and 2) square scenes of 5.5 km × 5.5 km in size.
 The following additional products can also be generated: a) elevation models from multipass interferometric products, b) multipass stereo products, c) change detection products, d) products with enhanced radiometric resolution.

Launches

Contractors
 Prime contractor: OHB-System
 LSE Space Engineering & Operations AG

Future 
A replacement of SAR-Lupe, called SARah, will be put into service from 2022. It will consist of 3 radar satellites and one optical satellite. The satellites of SARah will be bigger and more capable than those of SAR-Lupe.  SARah-1, a phased-array-antenna satellite, launched on Falcon 9 on 18 June 2022 and SARah-2 and -3, passive-antenna synthetic aperture radars, are planned to be launched on Falcon 9 sometime in 2022.

See also
SAOCOM, two Argentine SAR-satellites.
COSMO-SkyMed, a system of four military and civil SAR-satellites of Italy
TerraSAR-X, a civilian German radar satellite
European Union Satellite Centre

References 

SAR-Lupe Constellation, eoPortal Directory
Germany’s SAR-Lupe constellation puts Europe ahead, C4ISR Journal

German Earth-observing radar satellite launched

Imaging reconnaissance satellites
Satellites of Germany
Synthetic aperture radar satellites
Satellite constellations
Military equipment introduced in the 2000s